Urbinella is a genus of flowering plants in the family Asteraceae.

The genus is named in honor of Dr. Manuel Urbina, at one time Director of the National Museum in the Mexican capital.

Species
There is only one known species, Urbinella palmeri, found only in the state of Durango in Mexico.

References

Tageteae
Flora of Durango
Monotypic Asteraceae genera